A Jacobi operator, also known as Jacobi matrix, is a symmetric linear operator acting on sequences which is given by an infinite tridiagonal matrix. It is commonly used to specify systems of orthonormal polynomials over a finite, positive Borel measure. This operator is named after Carl Gustav Jacob Jacobi.

The name derives from a theorem from Jacobi, dating to 1848, stating that every symmetric matrix over a principal ideal domain is congruent to a tridiagonal matrix.

Self-adjoint Jacobi operators 
The most important case is the one of self-adjoint Jacobi operators acting on the Hilbert space of square summable sequences over the positive integers . In this case it is given by

where the coefficients are assumed to satisfy

The operator will be bounded if and only if the coefficients are bounded.

There are close connections with the theory of orthogonal polynomials. In fact, the solution  of the recurrence relation

is a polynomial of degree n and these polynomials are orthonormal with respect to the spectral measure corresponding to the first basis vector .

This recurrence relation is also commonly written as

Applications 
It arises in many areas of mathematics and physics. The case a(n) = 1 is known as the discrete one-dimensional Schrödinger operator. It also arises in:

 The Lax pair of the Toda lattice.
 The three-term recurrence relationship of orthogonal polynomials, orthogonal over a positive and finite Borel measure.
 Algorithms devised to calculate Gaussian quadrature rules, derived from systems of orthogonal polynomials.

Generalizations 
When one considers Bergman space, namely the space of square-integrable holomorphic functions over some domain, then, under general circumstances, one can give that space a basis of orthogonal polynomials, the Bergman polynomials. In this case, the analog of the tridiagonal Jacobi operator is a Hessenberg operator – an infinite-dimensional Hessenberg matrix. The system of orthogonal polynomials is given by

Here, D is the Hessenberg operator that generalizes the tridiagonal Jacobi operator J for this situation. Note that D is the right-shift operator on the Bergman space: that is, it is given by

The zeros of the Bergman polynomial  correspond to the eigenvalues of the principal  submatrix of D.  That is, The Bergman polynomials are the characteristic polynomials for the principal submatrices of the shift operator.

References

External links
 

Operator theory
Hilbert space
Recurrence relations